Apparswami Temple is a Hindu temple built in honour of Apparswami, a 19th-century Saivite saint. The temple, situated on Royapettah High Road, Chennai, Tamil Nadu, India, is built around his tomb over which a shivalinga was set up by his chief devotee Chidambaraswamy.

See also
 Religion in Chennai

References 

 

Hindu temples in Chennai